Manzini is an Italian surname. Notable people with the surname include:

Baptiste Manzini (1920 – 2008) professional American football player and high school football coach
Carlo Antonio Manzini (1599-1677/1678), an Italian astronomer and mathematician
Ezio Manzini, Italian design academic and author
Gianna Manzini (1896-1974), Italian writer
Italia Almirante Manzini (1890 – 1941), Italian silent film actress
Lerato Manzini (born 1991), South African professional footballer
Luigi Manzini (1805–1866), Neoclassical painter from Modena
Michael Manzini, a South African football player 
Pier Conti-Manzini, (1946–2003), Italian olympic rower (1968 and 1972)
Raimondo Manzini (1668-1744), Bolognese painter
Raimondo Manzini (1901–1988), Catholic journalist and parliamentarian
Rhulani Manzini (born 1988), South African soccer player
Sasekani Janet Manzini (born 1979), South African politician

See also 
 Manzini (disambiguation)

Italian-language surnames
Bantu-language surnames